Dumont d'Urville was a  of the French Navy, designed to operate from French colonies in Asia and Africa. She was built by Ateliers et Chantiers Maritime Sud-Ouest of Bordeaux and launched on 21 March 1931.

Service history

After the Fall of France Dumont d'Urville remained under Vichy French control and in September 1940 she was in New Caledonia as a part the Vichy government's attempt to gain control of the French colony. However, the Royal Australian Navy cruiser  arrived carrying a Free French temporary governor, which led the Vichy governor to depart aboard Dumont d'Urville on 25 September.

On the night of 16–17 January 1941 Dumont d'Urville took part in the Battle of Koh Chang.

By 1944 Dumont d'Urvilles armament had been augmented with the addition of four single-mounted 40 mm anti-aircraft (AA) guns, 11 single-mounted 20 mm AA guns, four anti-submarine mortars and two racks for 66 depth charges.

Dumont d'Urville remained in French Navy service after the war until 26 March 1958 when she was scrapped.

References

Sources

 

 

Bougainville-class avisos
Ships built in France
1931 ships